Nananu-i-Cake [nɑː.nɑːˈnuː iː ðɑːˈkeː] is an island in Fiji less than one kilometer off the coast of the main island of Viti Levu, near the Rakiraki-district in Ra Province.

Nananu-i-Cake is located immediately next to the island of Nananu-i-Ra.

The island's name, Nananu-i-Cake, means "Daydream Upwind" (or easterly) in Fijian. The island is also known by several other names, including Ananugata, Nananugata, Yananu and Nananu-i-Thake Island.

The main residence on the island was designed by the architecture firm of Murray Cockburn, based in Auckland.  A deep-water jetty is on the island's western shore.

History 
In 1974, British businessman and politician Sir Harold Mitchell visited Fiji from the UK and purchased Nananu-i-Cake and Mabua as a retreat. Because of Harold's position of Vice-Chairman of the Conservative Party under Sir Winston Churchill and his social and political standing, several high-profile dignitaries visited and stayed on the island. Commemorative trees were planted for many of these high-profile visits. Nananu-i-Cake has remained in Sir Harold Mitchell's family since 1974.

Nananu-i-Cake also retains evidence of moka, stone formations built in tidal areas to trap fish at low tide, and ring-wall fortifications built with volcanic rocks.

As of 2012, the entire island was tentatively available for sale as a private island, for an estimated equivalent of around $8-8.5 million USD.

The island received renewed attention in 2022 as a group of cryptocurrency supporters attempted to raise funds to buy the island as a haven for cryptocurrency supporters known as Cryptoland. The plan, which fell through, was widely mocked on social media and compared to the Fyre festival.

References 

Islands of Fiji
Viti Levu
Ra Province
Private islands of Fiji